Ramme Gaard is an organic farm and country estate, located by the Oslofjord just north of Hvitsten in Vestby municipality, Viken, Norway. Ramme Gaard is owned by billionaire philanthropist Petter Olsen.

Developed as a working farm on organic principles from its inception, the Baroque garden which is open to the public features sculptures, ponds, fountains, and cascades.

Olsen also facilitates and sponsors cultural projects around the estate grounds. The open air amphitheatre is used as a public performance area. This includes the annual Rock Festival which has featured performances by CC Cowboys, Deadaheads, and Neil Young. 

Since Olsen became a patron sponsor of the British Shakespeare Company in 2006, the company have performed in the amphitheatre each year since:
2006: A Midsummer Night's Dream and Romeo and Juliet
2007: Henry VI
2009: Much Ado About Nothing with Kåre Conradi as a guest

External links
RammeGaard.no (in Norwegian)

Vestby
Farms in Viken
Organic farming in Norway
Music venues in Norway
Amphitheatres in Norway